See Arusha (disambiguation).

The Arusha Agreement was a treaty signed on 24 September 1969 in Arusha, Tanzania, between the European Community and the three East African states of Kenya, Uganda and Tanzania. The agreement entered into force on 1 January 1971, concomitant with the second Yaoundé Convention, with the aim of establishing better economic relations between the EC and the African states. At the end of their validity time, the Lomé Convention was signed which substituted the previous agreements and enlarged them to 46 ACP countries.

History 

In 1967, three East African countries (Kenya, Tanzania and Uganda) that were not members of the Associated African and Malagasy States (AAMS), but were instead member states of the Commonwealth of Nations combined to establish the East African Community (EAC). On 26 July 1968 the EEC signed an initial Association Agreement with the EAC. That Agreement did not enter into force because it was not ratified by all the countries involved. On 24 September 1969 in Arusha, a second Agreement was signed between the EEC and the EAC. That Agreement was signed at the same time as the Convention of Association between the EEC and the AAMS (Yaoundé II); both the Arusha Agreement and the Yaoundé II Convention entered into force on 1 January 1971 for a period of five years.

Content 

The Arusha Agreement established a trade association (partial free-trade areas and joint institutions) but, unlike the Yaoundé II Convention, without financial and technical cooperation. Accordingly, the Agreement covered trade (Title I), the right of establishment and the provision of services (Title II), payments and capital (Title III), institutional provisions (Title IV), and general and final provisions (Title V).

See also
 East African Community
List of treaties

References

ACP–European Union relations
Treaties entered into by the European Union
Treaties of Uganda
Treaties of Kenya
Treaties of Tanzania
1969 in Uganda
1969 in Kenya
1969 in Tanzania
1971 in Uganda
1971 in Kenya
1971 in Tanzania
Arusha
Treaties concluded in 1969
Treaties entered into force in 1971